Hans Waldemar Ruin (18 June 1891 – 3 November 1980) was a Finnish philosopher and writer of Swedish-Finnish extraction.

1891 births
1980 deaths
Dobloug Prize winners
Finnish philosophers
Finnish writers
Writers from Helsinki
Swedish-language writers
20th-century Swedish philosophers
Swedish people of Finnish descent